The 1936–37 Rugby Football League season was the 42nd season of rugby league football.

Season summary
Salford won their third Championship after beating Warrington 13-11 in the play-off final. Salford had also finished the regular season as league leaders.

The Challenge Cup winners were Widnes who beat Keighley 18-5 in the final.

Acton and Willesden were replaced by Newcastle. Streatham and Mitcham disbanded after playing 26 matches, its remaining 12 matches were recorded as forfeits to their opponents.

Salford won the Lancashire League, and Leeds won the Yorkshire League. Salford beat Wigan 5–2 to win the Lancashire County Cup, and York beat Wakefield Trinity 9–2 to win the Yorkshire County Cup.

Championship

Championship play-offs

Challenge Cup

Widnes beat Keighley 18-5 in the final played at Wembley Stadium in front of a crowd of 47,699.

This was Widnes' second Challenge Cup final win in three Final appearances.

This was Keighley's first, and to date, only Challenge Cup final appearance.

European Championship

The tri-nation tournament was played between November 1936 and April 1937 as single round robin games between England, France and Wales. This was the third Rugby League European Championship, won by Wales.

Match Details

References

 1936-37 Rugby Football League season at wigan.rlfans.com
 The Challenge Cup at The Rugby Football League website

1936 in English rugby league
1937 in English rugby league
Northern Rugby Football League seasons